Attanagalla is an electorate in Gampaha District, situated in the Western Province of Sri Lanka.

References

Populated places in Western Province, Sri Lanka
Grama Niladhari divisions of Sri Lanka